Baughman Township is one of the sixteen townships of Wayne County, Ohio, United States.  The 2000 census found 4,699 people in the township, 2,873 of whom lived in the unincorporated portions of the township.

Geography
Located in the eastern part of the county, it borders the following townships:
Chippewa Township - north
Lawrence Township, Stark County - east
Tuscarawas Township, Stark County - southeast
Sugar Creek Township - south
East Union Township - southwest corner
Green Township - west
Milton Township - northwest corner

Parts of two municipalities are located in Baughman Township: the village of Marshallville in the north, and the city of Orrville in the west.

Name and history
It is the only Baughman Township nationwide.

Government
The township is governed by a three-member board of trustees, who are elected in November of odd-numbered years to a four-year term beginning on the following January 1. Two are elected in the year after the presidential election and one is elected in the year before it. There is also an elected township fiscal officer, who serves a four-year term beginning on April 1 of the year after the election, which is held in November of the year before the presidential election. Vacancies in the fiscal officership or on the board of trustees are filled by the remaining trustees.

References

External links
Wayne County township map
County website

Townships in Wayne County, Ohio
Townships in Ohio